My Way Is My Decision is the first single of Slovenian Alpine skier Tina Maze released in 2012.

Background 

While in primary school, in addition to skiing, Maze also played piano. During preparations for the 2013 season she recorded her first song "My Way Is My Decision". She also blogged about the story on her trip into music. The news of Maze becoming a "popstar" or "rockstar" was a celebrity news in her country and she got some attention in foreign media too.

Song writing 

The song "My Way Is My Decision" was produced by Raay, one of the top Slovenian producers and music written by Matjaž Jelen & Raay, lyrics by Charlie Mason & Leon Oblak. It's a modern mainstream radio-friendly up-tempo song with a hint of rock. It was released on 26 October, the day before the first race of the season in Solden. The music video has become the most viewed new video on YouTube by a Slovenian music artist as it reached over 400,000 views in less than 3 days, which is Slovenia's fastest growing video in music business industry. In February 2013, it reached 1,000,000 views.

Credits and personnel 

 Raay – music, arranger, producer
 Matjaž Jelen – music
 Charlie Mason – lyrics
 Leon Oblak – lyrics
 Tina Maze – vocals

Charts

Weekly charts

References 

2012 singles
Slovenian songs
Songs with lyrics by Charlie Mason (lyricist)